Hungary–Pakistan relations are foreign relations between Hungary and Pakistan.  Both countries established diplomatic relations on November 26, 1965. Since 1970, Hungary has an embassy in Islamabad and an honorary consulate in Karachi.  Pakistan has an embassy in Budapest

Economic relations
As of 2013, Hungary has invested US$1.4 billion in the energy sector in Pakistan.

In 2012, the volume of trade between the two countries was US$56 million.

Hungarian based MOL Pakistan Oil & Gas Company has been operating since 2004 in Khyber Pakhtunkhwa.

Defence co-operation
The Hungarian Chief of Defence Staff, General Andres Havril visited Pakistan Minister of Defence Rao Sikandar Iqbal

Hungarian assistance
The Hungarian Government has offered assistance to Pakistan during the 2011 floods and 2005 Kashmir earthquake.

Resident diplomatic missions
of Hungary in Pakistan
 Embassy: Islamabad
 Consulate Honorary: Karachi

of Pakistan in Hungary
 Embassy: Budapest

See also
 Foreign relations of Hungary
 Foreign relations of Pakistan

References

External links
  Hungarian embassy in Islamabad
  Pakistani embassy in Budapest

 
Pakistan
Bilateral relations of Pakistan